The Aceca (pronounced "A-See-Ka") is a closed coupé from the British AC Cars company, produced from 1954 until 1963. The car originally had an AC engine but the similar Bristol-engined Aceca-Bristol was also available alongside the original from 1956 to 1963 when production of that engine ceased. A few cars were built from 1961 to 1963 with a 2553 cc tuned Ford Zephyr engine and sold as the Aceca 2.6.

Based on the open two-seat AC Ace, the Aceca was a hand-built grand tourer in the British tradition, with ash wood and steel tubing used in their construction. One notable feature was the hatchback at the rear, making the Aceca only the second car, after the 1953 Aston Martin DB2/4, to incorporate this element.

151 Acecas, 169 Aceca-Bristols and 8 Ford-engined models had been built when production halted in 1963. As with the Ace, AC used chassis numbers beginning with AE for AC-engined cars, BE for Bristol-engined ones, and RS for those equipped with the Ford unit. An "X" following the first two letters indicated an export model.

The main difference between the Aceca and Aceca-Bristol was the engine. Both used a straight-6 unit, but the Aceca shared its ,  overhead camshaft AC engine with the lighter AC Ace, while the Aceca-Bristol used a 125 hp (93 kW) "D-Type" 2.0 L (1971 cc/120 in³) unit sourced from Bristol Cars. The Aceca-Bristol was also available with a milder "B-Type" Bristol engine of 105 hp (78 kW). The Bristol specification added $1000 to the Aceca's $5,400 price tag in the United States. In the UK, the basic car cost £1722.

The front-end styling of the Ace and Aceca reportedly traces back to a design done by Pinin Farina for AC in the late 1940s. An alternative theory is that it was inspired by the Ferrari Barchetta of the day. The car is rather light owing to a tubular frame, aluminium engine block and aluminium body panels. Large 16" spoked road wheels and near 50/50 weight distribution allowed exceptional handling on substandard road surfaces. Later Acecas feature front-wheel disc brakes (added in 1957), while all share transverse leaf spring IRS, articulated rear half-axles, worm-gear steering, an optional overdrive on 2nd, 3rd and 4th gears, curved windscreen, and leather-covered bucket seats. The suspension is independent at the front and rear using transverse leaf springs.

The AC Aceca featured in the UK "Car SOS" programme (series 4 episode 2).

Aceca-Bristol

The in-line six Bristol engine fitted to the Aceca-Bristol was based on a design from BMW with cast iron block and aluminium cylinder head. It has a single camshaft with pushrods running vertically to a rocker shaft on the inlet side of the engine and further horizontal pushrods running in 6 tubes over the top of the engine in order to reach the exhaust rockers. The two inclined rocker covers give the engine a similar appearance to an overhead - camshaft arrangement. Three inline Solex downdraft carburettors were bolted directly to the cylinder head casting using small adaptor plates.

References
http://www.conceptcarz.com/vehicle/z16796/AC-Aceca.aspx

Aceca
Coupés
Rear-wheel-drive vehicles
Cars introduced in 1954
1960s cars